SEATTLE LATINO FILM FESTIVAL (SLFF) is a 501(c)(3) non profit organization.

History

SLFF was founded in 2009 by Cuban-born, Internationally known Poet and Film Industry Professional Jorge Enrique González Pacheco. SLFF has the goal to bring audiences and filmmakers together for an educational experience and to support the magic of filmmaking as a part of Hispanic culture globally. The festival discovers and presents independent films, documentaries and short films from Latin American countries, Spain and Portugal at the Northwest of the United States. SLFF is ranked at the Top 5 of the best Latin-American Film Festival in the United States. The SLFF is the only forum in the Pacific Northwest for genuine Spanish & Portuguese cinema.

Festivals

 Seattle Latino Film Festival, 2009-Spotlight country: Colombia
 Seattle Latino Film Festival, 2010-Spotlight country: Mexico
 Seattle Latino Film Festival, 2011-Spotlight country: Argentina
 Seattle Latino Film Festival, 2012-Spotlight country: Brazil
 Seattle Latino Film Festival, 2013-Spotlight country: Cuba
 Seattle Latino Film Festival, 2014-Spotlight country: Chile
 Seattle Latino Film Festival, 2015-Spotlight country: Peru
 Seattle Latino Film Festival, 2016-Spotlight country: Venezuela
 Seattle Latino Film Festival, 2017-Spotlight country: Dominican Republic
 Seattle Latino Film Festival, 2018-Spotlight country: Spain
 Seattle  Latino Film Festival 2019
 Seattle Latino Film Festival 2020
 Seattle Latino Film Festival 2021
 Seattle Latino Film Festival 2022

Guests

 Leon Ichaso, Cuban-American Film Director.
 Fernando Trueba, Spanish Academy Award winner.
 Damian Alcazar, Mexican actor.
 Rafa Lara, Mexican Director.
 Yvette Marichal, Film Commissioner from Dominican Republic.
 Fina Torres

Press

 Seattle supporters of Latino films excited by Alfonso Cuarón’s Oscar win
 Seattle skateboarder captures Mexico City’s intimate underground economy on film
 Seattle Latino Film Festival comes to Redmond

References

Film festivals in Washington (state)
Festivals in Seattle
Film festivals established in 2009